The 2023 Indian Super League Final was the ninth Indian Super League final match, played to determine the champions of the 2022–23 Indian Super League. It was played on 18 March 2023 between ATK Mohun Bagan and Bengaluru at the Fatorda Stadium in Margao.

ATK Mohun Bagan played their second final and Bengaluru played their third final. The match ended 2–2 after extra time, with ATK Mohun Bagan winning 4–3 on penalties to secure their first Indian Super League title.

The playoff champions, ATK Mohun Bagan, thus qualified for Indian playoffs for 2023–24 AFC competitions against Hyderabad, the champions of 2021–22 Indian Super League for a place in 2023–24 AFC Cup qualifying playoff round. If any one of them also win the 2023 Super Cup, then that team will qualify for the additional playoff for 2023–24 AFC Cup group stage, while the other team will automatically qualify for 2023–24 AFC Cup qualifying playoff round.

Background
ATK Mohun Bagan finished third in the regular season table and won 2–0 in the playoff knockout against Odisha. They then went on to win 0–0 aggregate via penalties (4–3) against league runners-up and defending champions Hyderabad in the playoff semi-final to qualify for the final.

Bengaluru finished fourth in the regular season table and won 1–0 in the playoff knockout against Kerala Blasters. They then went on to win 2–2 aggregate via penalties (9–8) against table toppers Mumbai City in the playoff semi-final to qualify for the final.

Match

References

External links
 Indian Super League Official Website.

Indian Super League finals
2022–23 Indian Super League season
2022–23 in Indian football
Indian Super League Final
Bengaluru FC matches